Flight of the Stag is a 1981 role-playing game adventure published by Marischal Adventures for Traveller.

Plot summary
Flight of the Stag is the first of Marishcal's folio adventures, and deals with the exploits of the Gazelle-class close escort Stag during the Fifth Frontier War.

Publication history
Flight of the Stag was written by J. Andrew Keith, with art by William H. Keith Jr., and was published in 1981 by Marischal Adventures as a 4-page pamphlet; a second edition was published in 1986 by Seeker.

Reception
William A. Barton reviewed Flight of the Stag in The Space Gamer No. 46. Barton commented that "I highly recommend Flight of the Stag as an excellent example of a brief, simple, yet highly playable adventure for Traveller."

Reviews
Different Worlds #18 (Jan., 1982)

References

Role-playing game supplements introduced in 1981
Traveller (role-playing game) adventures